Khoobsurat is a 2014 Indian Hindi-language romantic comedy-drama film. The film is directed by Shashanka Ghosh and produced by Rhea Kapoor, Anil Kapoor and Siddharth Roy Kapur. It stars Sonam Kapoor, Fawad Khan, Kirron Kher, Ratna Pathak and Aamir Raza Hussain. The film is loosely based on the 1980 film of the same name.

Plot
Mrinalini "Mili" Chakravarty is a physiotherapist who works for the a royal family . Her loud Punjabi mother Manju hopes that she will find a suitable and charming man to marry. Her services are called upon by a royal family in Rajasthan where King Shekhar Singh Rathore is paralyzed from the waist down. She is told that 40 doctors have already left a demanding job.

Mili travels to the royal palace and meets the discipline-oriented queen, Nirmala Devi Rathore, who is not amused by Mili's enthusiasm and clumsiness. Mili finds that her casual way of living clashes with the strict discipline of the royal household. She meets the prince, Vikram Singh Rathore, whose distant personality makes him similar to his parents. Mili befriends Divya Rathore, the youngest child princess of the family, and encourages her passion for cinema against the family's wishes that she study business management.

Shekhar avoids the exercises Mili prescribes and she turns to Vikram for help. He gives Mili the same answer that Nirmala gave her - if she can't stand the heat, might as well get out of the kitchen. Mili becomes frustrated and tells them that they should be helping Shekhar, accusing them of being stubborn, rigid and self-centered.

Mili is about to leave when she learns from Ram Sevak, Shekhar's trusted servant, that Shekhar's injury came from a car accident that killed his eldest son. The queen's demeanor changed due to his paralysis and the responsibilities thrust upon her, and the once-happy atmosphere of the royal household came to its present state. Mili shames Shekhar into getting over his guilt and tries to befriend him through conversation and video games, and encourages him to talk about the car accident.

Mili sees improvements after 2–3 months with Shekhar, who persuades Vikram to take Mili with him to Surajgarh Palace. They spend some time together, and the prince leaves for a meeting while she shops. Mili is kidnapped; when Vikram saves her, they share a kiss. Though they agree to set aside their attraction, the two start falling in love. Mili confesses her love for him but Vikram refuses to acknowledge it, saying that they come from two different stocks; he is also engaged to a lady of his status, Kiara.

Divya runs away for film auditions in Jaipur. Mili informs Nirmala that she knew about Divya's plans, and is ordered out of the palace, heartbroken over Vikram's rejection. Divya returns and tells Nirmala that she came back because of Mili. Shekhar then surprises Nirmala by rising to his feet and admitting that he saw Divya run away. He tells her that this is what Mili has been trying to teach them: to love life as it is. Vikram breaks off his engagement with Kiara and confesses his love for Mili; his parents give their blessing and send him to find her in Delhi.

Vikram eventually finds Mili at a paintball arena, and declares his love for her. Covered in paint, he wins her mother's approval by proposing in her style. They are married, with Mili given the title of "The Royal Misfit".

Cast
Sonam Kapoor as Dr. Mrinalini "Mili" Rathore (nee: Chakravarty), a physiotherapist; Manju and Pritam's daughter; Kabir's sister; Shekar's doctor; Vikram's wife
Fawad Khan as Prince Vikram Singh Rathore, the prince, Mili's husband and Kiara's ex-fiancée 
Kirron Kher as Manju Chakravarty, Mili's mother
Aamir Raza Husain as King Shekhar Singh Rathore, Vikram's father; Mili's patient
Ratna Pathak Shah as Queen Nirmala Devi Rathore, Vikram's mother
Simran Jehani as Princess Divya Rathore, Vikram's younger sister
Ashok Banthia as Ram Sevak, Shekhar's most trusted royal servant
Aditi Rao Hydari as Kiara, a lady of Vikram's status and his ex-fiancée (extended cameo appearance)
Rishab Chadha as Kabir Chakravarty, Mili's brother
Cyrus Sahukar as Nausher Bandookwaala
Kaizaad Kotwal as Pritam Chakravarty, Mili's father
Yashwant Singh as Maharaja Suraj Maan Singh

Music

The music of Khoobsurat was composed by Sneha Khanwalkar, featuring two additional numbers composed by Badshah and Amaal Mallik. The lyrics were written by a range of artists including, Ikram Rajasthani, Badshah, Kumaar, Sunil Choudhary, Amitabh Verma and Sneha Khanwalkar. The first song, "Engine Ki Seeti", was released on 7 August 2014, and samples Rajasthani folk song "Anjun Ki Seeti" which Ikram Rajasthani specifically re-wrote for the film. A promotional song titled "Abhi Toh Party Shuru Hui Hai", composed by Punjabi rapper Badshah, was released on 22 August 2014. The film's soundtrack was officially released on 1 September 2014.

The producers felt that the film lacked a soulful love song and upon the request of Rhea Kapoor, music composer Amaal Mallik wrote the song "Naina", which is sung by his brother Armaan Malik and Sona Mohapatra.

Box office

Domestic
Khoobsurat opened to a slow start at the box office, with occupancies ranging from 15 to 20 percent at multiplexes and single screens across India. The film netted a total of  during the first three days of release, with Box Office India describing the weekend collections as "low", but with "good" trending. The film remained steady throughout the rest of the week, netting  in India alone. Remaining steady on its eighth day of release, the film collected , and a further  on its ninth day, being declared as a "hit" by various media outlets.

Overseas
Khoobsurat performed fairly well overseas.

Awards and nominations

Critical reception
Khoobsurat garnered mixed to positive reviews from critics but received widespread critical acclaim overseas.

Koel Puri of India Today gave the film 4/5, saying "[the film] is no path breaker but for the fact that I just can't fault it, I still have a smile plastered on my face and I'll probably go see it again... tomorrow". Subhash K. Jha also gave a 4/5 and said, "Hrishida won't recognise this as his Khubsoorat. But he won't disapprove of what has been done to his work". Rachit Gupta of Filmfare gave the film a 4/5 and said that, "director Shashank Ghosh is no Hrishikesh Mukherjee" though manages "to make a perfect Disney movie. It makes you laugh. It makes you go 'aww' and that goes a long way in a young romance". Saibaal Chatterjee of NDTV also gave a positive review, giving the film a 3.5/5 and saying, "in the end, Khoobsurat is a pretty good show. It is both funny and flashy, but its many flourishes are delivered in measures that religiously avoid excess".

Srijana Mitra Das of Times of India gave the film 3.5/5 and said, "This delightfully roguish romance tickles everything fun-loving inside you ... that's what makes it so khoobsurat." Rajeev Masand of CNN IBN gave a rating of 3/5 and wrote, "Khoobsurat is for those seeking comfort in the familiar, it's a pretty satisfying watch." Sarita A. Tanwar of DNA India gave the film 3/5 and said it "is sure to connect with the hearts of girls of all ages". Sonia Chopra of Sify also gave the film a 3/5, and said "this film has little of the gentle nuance of the Hrishikesh Mukherjee-directed original, but it's still pretty good fun. This Bollywood-Disney fairytale combo is worth a shot". Raja Sen, of Rediff gave the film 3/5, and compared it to candy, saying "wrapped in bright plastic and frequently too sweet for your own good, they act as sunny, unsurprising treats that lead to sticky, syrupy smiles". Andy Webster of the New York Times also wrote positively, saying "Bollywood films have appropriated Hollywood genres and imagery for years, but Mr. Ghosh, using a pleasing pastel palette, deftly achieves a particularly Disney-like polish. And he avoids making-of-a-royal pitfalls: Ms. Kapoor’s character never abandons her humor for refinement. Twice, Mili says that she was raised to speak up for herself. Not a bad characteristic for a future Rajput princess".

A critic at Bollywood Hungama gave the film 2.5/5, and said, "overall, Khoobsurat is likeable in parts with good performances and stunning visuals; however the weak script is an 'ugly' hurdle this film will face at the box-office". Sweta Kaushal of Hindustan Times also gave a negative review, giving the film a 1/5, and said "the film could have been more tolerable".

References

External links
 
 

2014 films
2010s Hindi-language films
2014 romantic comedy-drama films
Disney India films
Films scored by Sneha Khanwalkar
Indian romantic comedy-drama films
Films scored by Amaal Mallik
Films scored by Badshah
Remakes of Indian films
UTV Motion Pictures films
Films directed by Shashanka Ghosh
2014 comedy-drama films